The 2024 IHF Women's Junior World Championship will be 24th edition of the championship to be held at North Macedonia under the aegis of International Handball Federation (IHF). It will be third time in history that the championship will be organised by Macedonian Handball Federation.

Bidding process
Two nations entered bid for hosting the tournament:
 
 

Slovenia later withdrew their bid. The tournament was awarded to North Macedonia by IHF Council in its meeting held in Cairo, Egypt on 28 February 2020.

References

External links

2024 Women's Junior World Handball Championship
Women's Junior World Handball Championship
2024
Women's handball in North Macedonia
Junior World Handball Championship
Women's Junior World Handball Championship
World Women's Junior